The 2008–09 NCAA Division I men's ice hockey season began on October 10, 2008 and concluded with the 2009 NCAA Division I men's ice hockey tournament's championship game on April 11, 2009 at the Verizon Center in Washington, D.C. Over the course of the season, five teams achieved the nation's #1 ranking, with Boston University finishing the season as the top-ranked team after winning the national championship tournament. This was the 62nd season in which an NCAA ice hockey championship was held and is the 115th year overall where an NCAA school fielded a team.

Pre-season polls

The top 20 from USCHO.com/CBS College Sports, October 6, 2008, and the top 15 from USA Today/USA Hockey Magazine, September 22, 2008.

Regular season

Season format
Beginning in 2008–09, a shootout is used to determine CCHA conference games that end in a tie. Shootout losers receive one point and an addition to their total number of ties. Shootout winners receive one point and an addition to their total number of ties, and as a bonus, receive one bonus point and an addition to their total number of shootout wins.

Season tournaments

Standings

2009 NCAA tournament

Note: * denotes overtime period(s)

Player stats

Scoring leaders
The following players led the league in points at the conclusion of the season.

 
GP = Games played; G = Goals; A = Assists; Pts = Points; PIM = Penalty minutes

Leading goaltenders
The following goaltenders led the league in goals against average at the end of the regular season while playing at least 33% of their team's total minutes.

GP = Games played; Min = Minutes played; W = Wins; L = Losses; OT = Overtime/shootout losses; GA = Goals against; SO = Shutouts; SV% = Save percentage; GAA = Goals against average

Awards

NCAA

Atlantic Hockey

CCHA

CHA

ECAC

Hockey East

WCHA

See also
 2008–09 NCAA Division III men's ice hockey season

References

External links
USCHO.com

 
NCAA